Justina Bricka (born February 14, 1943) is an American former tennis player from St. Louis, Missouri.

In 1961 she was called up for the United States Wightman Cup team and had a win over Angela Mortimer.

Bricka's best year of doubles came while the partner of Margaret Smith in 1962, with seven tournament titles and a runner-up finish at the French Championships.

In 1965 she was a singles quarter-finalist at the Wimbledon Championships.

Later in her career she competed as Justina Horowitz, from her then marriage to tennis player Dick Horowitz.

Grand Slam finals

Doubles (1 runner-up)

References

External links
 

1943 births
Living people
American female tennis players
Tennis players from St. Louis